Federal Route 3265, or Jalan Nilai–Pajam (formerly Negeri Sembilan state route N36), is an industrial federal road in Negeri Sembilan, Malaysia.

The Kilometre Zero is located at Salak, Selangor.

At most sections, the Federal Route 3265 was built under the JKR R5 road standard, allowing maximum speed limit of up to 90 km/h.

List of junctions

References

Malaysian Federal Roads
Transport in Negeri Sembilan